Cerro Coposa is a mountain in the Andes of Chile. It has a height of 4668 metres.

Notes

See also
List of mountains in the Andes

Mountains of Chile